Although Bob Kane achieved renown for creating the fictional superhero Batman, he and others have acknowledged the contributions of Bill Finger for fleshing the character out, writing many of his early stories, and creating the character's origin. Many other comic book creators (writers, artists, and sometimes editors who contributed important ideas or altered how the character would be presented) have contributed to the character's history since Batman's introduction in Detective Comics #27 in 1939. This list identifies some who made notable contributions with enduring impact.

Creators of Batman
 Bob Kane — concept, creator and artist. Co-created several secondary characters including junior partner/protege Dick Grayson/Robin, Alfred Pennyworth (as Alfred Beagle), Jim Gordon, the Joker, Selina Kyle/Catwoman, the Penguin, Two-Face, Mr. Freeze (as Mr. Zero), Scarecrow, Basil Karlo/Clayface, Mad Hatter, Hugo Strange, Deadshot, Cavalier, The Monk, gangsters Sal Maroni, Tony Zucco, and Joe Chill, photographer Vicki Vale, Julie Madison, Bette Kane/Bat-Girl, Bat-Mite, Dick Grayson's parents Mary and John Grayson, and Bruce Wayne's parents Martha and Thomas Wayne.
 Bill Finger — co-creator and developer (uncredited from 1939 to 2015, credited 2016-present), also a writer. Also co-created several secondary characters including Dick Grayson/Robin, Alfred Pennyworth, Jim Gordon, the Joker, Selina Kyle/Catwoman, the Riddler, the Penguin, Two-Face, Scarecrow, Calendar Man, Basil Karlo/Clayface and Matt Hagen/Clayface, Mad Hatter, mad scientists Hugo Strange and Professor Achilles Milo, Killer Moth, gangsters Sal Maroni, Tony Zucco, and Joe Chill, Vicki Vale, Ace the Bat-Hound, Bat-Mite, Bette Kane/Bat-Girl, Thomas Blake/Catman, Dick Grayson's parents Mary and John Grayson, and Bruce Wayne's parents Martha and Thomas Wayne.

Notable contributors
This is an incomplete list.

Writers & Artists
The following list is of people who have both written and drawn Batman comics.

Writers Only

Artists Only

Other notable contributors

See also
 List of Superman creators
 List of Wonder Woman creators
 List of Green Lantern creators

External links
UGO's World of Batman - Gotham's Greats

Lists of comics creators
Creators